Alfred Young Allee (September 14, 1905 – January 13, 1987) was the grandson of Alfred Allee who became sheriff of Karnes County, Texas in 1892. He was born in La Salle County, Texas and became a Texas Ranger like his father and grandfather.

Early history

In 1926, Alfred was a game warden in Zavala County, Texas and became a deputy sheriff for the county in 1927.

Texas Rangers

In 1931, Alfred joined the Texas Rangers was a part of Captain Light Townsend's C Company. In 1933, he resigned after Miriam "Ma" Ferguson was elected governor of Texas and became deputy sheriff in Beeville, Texas. Many other Texas Rangers also resigned at this time in protest of corruption from Ma's previous and future term.

In 1935, a new governor (James V. Allred) was elected and Alfred rejoined the Texas Rangers. Alfred ended up serving thirty-seven years as a Texas Ranger.

Reputation

In 1966, Texas farm workers walked off their jobs to protest low pay and poor working conditions. To stop the strikes, the ranch owners called in the Texas Rangers, with Allee serving as captain. After the Rangers used biased enforcement (e.g., dispersing "crowds" of farm workers from the courthouse steps, while allowing other groups to congregate there) and violence, the farm workers brought a lawsuit against them, with Allee as the first-named defendant. The case was eventually heard in the U.S. Supreme Court as Allee v. Medrano (1974). Delivering the court's decision, William O. Douglas told of a "violent and brutal" arrest led by Allee.

America's Lost Treasures

In July 2012, Captain Allee's gun was chosen during the first episode of America's Lost Treasures as "special recognition for the importance of the artifact in American history, which will be featured in a special exhibit at the National Geographic Museum in Washington, D.C., coming in 2013."

References

American police officers
1905 births
1987 deaths
People from Zavala County, Texas
People from Beeville, Texas
People from La Salle County, Texas